Michael Schönborn (born 2 November 1954 in Schruns) is an Austrian actor, and the brother of Cardinal Christoph Schönborn. He lives near Berlin and became known for his performances in TV series such as Der Winzerkönig, SOKO Kitzbühel and Zodiak. Lately, he has also performed in musicals.

Engagements
Source:

 Deutsches Schauspielhaus Hamburg
 Thalia Theater Hamburg
 Freies Theater Kampnagelfabrik Hamburg
 Hamburg Kammerspiele
 Stadt Theater Basel
  Frankfurt am Main
 Komödie am Kurfürstendamm Berlin
 Ronacher Vienna
 Theater in der Josefstadt, Vienna

Awards
 2017 Nestroy Theatre Prize nomination for Maria Stuart (Stadttheater Klagenfurt) as the best federal state performance

Memberships
 Member of the Deutsche Filmakademie.

References

Further reading

External links 
 
 

1954 births
Living people
Austrian male musical theatre actors
Austrian male television actors
Counts of Austria
People from Bludenz District
Michael